Dimitar Atanasov (born 26 April 1999) is a Bulgarian footballer who plays as a midfielder with Rilski Sportist Samokov.

Club career

Early career 
Atanasov began his professional career in 2018 with FC Vitosha Bistritsa in the First Professional Football League. In 2018, he played abroad in the Canadian Soccer League with SC Real Mississauga. In 2019, he signed with FC Arda Kardzhali but was loaned to FC Botev Galabovo in the Second League. In 2020, Arda released him from his contract.

Bulgaria 
In 2021, he signed with league rivals FC Marek Dupnitsa. He recorded his first goal for Marek on August 13, 2021, against FC Minyor Pernik. In January 2022, he was transferred to FC Sportist Svoge. He made his debut on February 19, 2022, against FC Levski Lom, recording his first goal for the club. After the conclusion of the season, he was released from his contract with Svoge.

Austria 
Following his stint with Svoge, he played abroad once more this time in Austria with Union Pettenbach. In total, he played in 13 matches.

Return to Bulgaria  
After a brief run abroad in Austria, he returned to his native country in 2023 to secure a deal with Rilski Sportist Samokov during the January transfer window.

References 

1999 births
Living people
Bulgarian footballers
FC Vitosha Bistritsa players
FC Arda Kardzhali players
FC Botev Galabovo players
PFC Marek Dupnitsa players
First Professional Football League (Bulgaria) players
Canadian Soccer League (1998–present) players
Association football midfielders
Second Professional Football League (Bulgaria) players
FC Sportist Svoge players
Footballers from Sofia